Chiriyo Chiri is a 1982 Indian Malayalam-language film, directed by Balachandra Menon and produced by P. V. Gangadharan. The film stars Balachandra Menon, Kaviyoor Ponnamma, Adoor Bhasi and Maniyanpilla Raju . The film has musical score by Raveendran. Art direction by Kalalayam Ravi.

Cast
 
Balachandra Menon as Unnikrishnan
Maniyanpilla Raju 
Swapna 
Kaviyoor Ponnamma 
Sankaradi 
Adoor Bhasi
Shubha 
Sreenivasan 
Adoor Bhavani 
Baby Ponnambili
Balan K. Nair as Abdul Rasaq
Kunjandi 
K. T. C. Abdulla 
Krishna Kurup 
Mammootty as extended cameo appearance
Nithya 
Seema as extended cameo appearance
Sukumari as extended cameo appearance
Paravoor Bharathan

Soundtrack
The lyrics were written by Bichu Thirumala and the music was composed by Raveendran. The song Ezhu Swarangalum sung by K. J. Yesudas is an evergreen hit. It is one of the best songs of Raveendran.

References

External links

see the movie
 chiriyo chiri

1982 films
1980s Malayalam-language films
Films directed by Balachandra Menon